Jan Erik Tiwaz, aka Tyr (born 22 June 1972) is the former bassist for the Norwegian heavy metal band Borknagar. He is known for his progressive playing style in black metal and his use of extended range basses. He also made of use of these in his later work with Borknagar, namely a 6 string fretless on 'Origin' and a custom 8 string fretless on 'Universal'. Tyr has also been a touring bassist for Satyricon, as featured in their live video Roadkill Extravaganza (2001) and with Emperor as seen in Emperial Live Ceremony (2000). He currently resides in Drammen, Norway.

During June 2010, an announcement was released that due to "general disagreements", Jan Erik Tiwaz left Borknagar.

Discography
Emperor : Emperial Live Ceremony (CD) (Candlelight 1999)
Emperor : Emperial Live Ceremony (VHS/DVD) (Candlelight/Plastichead 1999)
Satyricon : RoadKill Extravaganza (VHS/DVD) (Moonfog 2001)
Borknagar : Empiricism (CD) (Century Media Records 2001)
Borknagar : Origin (CD) (Century Media Records 2006)
Borknagar : Universal (CD) (Indie Recordings 2010)

Other releases
Morpheus Web : Through Different Eyes – A Tribute To Fates Warning : The Sorceress (CD) (Planet Sarcasm 1999)
Koldbrann : Infernal Gathering (Inferno Festival Sampler) : Fortapelse I Svovel Og Helvetesild (Guest Appearance) (CD) (Plastichead 2003)
Carpticon : Master Morality (Guest Appearance on "Darkened") (CD) (BlackSeed Productions 2006)

References

External links 
 Official Borknagar website
 Myspace Borknagar website

1972 births
Living people
Norwegian heavy metal bass guitarists
Norwegian male bass guitarists
Norwegian black metal musicians
Norwegian rock bass guitarists
Borknagar members
Satyricon (band) members
Emperor (band) members
21st-century Norwegian bass guitarists